An audition is a sample performance by an actor, singer, musician, dancer or other performing artist.

Audition may also refer to:
 The sense of hearing
 Adobe Audition, audio editing software
 Audition Online, an online dance battle game developed by T3 Entertainment and Yedang Online
 Computer Audition, a field of study in computer music and engineering

Film and television
 Audition, a 1963 film directed by Miloš Forman
 Audition (1999 film), a 1999 Japanese horror film directed by Takashi Miike
 Audition (2005 film), a 2005 Canadian film also known as L'Audition
 Audition (2007 film), a 2007 US student short
 Audition Records, a record label
 Auditions (film) a 1978 film directed by Harry Hurwitz
 "Audition" (Glee), a 2010 episode of Glee
 The Audition (2000 film), a 2000 US short film starring Hilary Swank
 The Audition (2015 film), a 2015 US short film starring Leonardo DiCaprio and Robert De Niro
 List of I Love Lucy episodes#The Audition, an episode in the first season of I Love Lucy
 Auditions (TV series), a 1962 television series which aired in Melbourne, Australia

Literature
 Audition: A Memoir, a 2008 autobiographical book by Barbara Walters
 Audition (novel), a 1997 Japanese novel by Ryu Murakami
 The Audition (novel), a novella in Robert Muchamore's Rock War series

Music 
 The Audition (album), a 2003 album by singer Janelle Monáe
 Audition (album), a 2006 album by rapper P.O.S.
 "Audition", a 2006 song by Korean singer Younha
 The Audition (band), a rock band previously signed to Victory Records
 "Audition (The Fools Who Dream)", a song from the 2016 musical film La La Land